De Medina is a surname. Notable people with the surname include:

 Bartolomé de Medina (theologian), Spanish theologian
 Eduardo Diez de Medina
 Federico Diez de Medina
 Juan de Medina
 Lucila Gamero de Medina
 Miguel de Medina
 Nathan de Medina, Belgian footballer
 Samuel de Medina
 Solomon de Medina

See also

 Medina